Harold Victor Knight (May 13, 1932 – July 13, 2016) was an American minor league baseball player and college football coach.
He served as the head football coach at Louisiana College from 1959 to 1961.

References

External links
 Baseball-Reference career statistics
 Louisiana College Hall of Fame profile

1932 births
2016 deaths
Baseball pitchers
Amsterdam Rugmakers players
Alexandria Aces players
LaGrange Troupers players
Louisiana Christian Wildcats and Lady Wildcats athletic directors
Louisiana Christian Wildcats football coaches
Meridian Millers players
People from Hattiesburg, Mississippi